Georges-Léon Pelletier (19 August 1904 – 24 September 1987) was a Canadian bishop of the Roman Catholic Church. He was Bishop of Trois-Rivières from 1947 to 1975. From Saint-Épiphane, Quebec, he was ordained in 1931. He was named bishop by Pius XII and consecrated auxiliary bishop of Jean-Marie-Rodrigue Villeneuve in Quebec City. He succeeded Maurice Roy as Bishop of Trois-Rivières. In 1975, he resigned and Laurent Noël succeeded him. He died in 1987.

Footnotes

1904 births
People from Bas-Saint-Laurent
1987 deaths
20th-century Roman Catholic bishops in Canada
Roman Catholic bishops of Trois-Rivières